Stanley Theater may refer to:
Stanley Theater (Jersey City), New Jersey
Stanley Theater (Newark, New Jersey)
Stanley Theater (Utica, New York)
Stanley Theatre, Pittsburgh, now the Benedum Center
Stanley Industrial Alliance Stage, formerly Stanley Theatre, Vancouver, British Columbia